Pseudocercospora puderi is a fungal plant pathogen infecting roses.

It produces suborbicular or irregular and angular leaf spots, from 2 to 5 mm wide. These are usually brown or grey-brown.

References

External links
 Index Fungorum
 USDA ARS Fungal Database

Fungal plant pathogens and diseases
Rose diseases
puderi
Fungi described in 1976